Kretania is a Palearctic genus of butterflies in the family Lycaenidae.

Species
Listed alphabetically within groups:

The eurypilus species-group:
 Kretania csomai (Bálint, 1992)
 Kretania eurypilus (Freyer, 1852) – eastern brown argus
 Kretania iranica (Forster, 1938)
 Kretania psylorita (Freyer, 1845) – Cretan argus
 Kretania zamotajlovi Shchurov & Lukhtanov, 2001

The pylaon species-group:
 Kretania allardii (Oberthür, 1874)
 Kretania beani (Bálint & Johnson, 1997)
 Kretania hesperica (Rambur, 1840)
 Kretania klausrosei (Bálint, 1992)
 Kretania martini (Allard, 1867) – Martin's blue
 Kretania modica (Verity, 1935)
 Kretania nicholli (Elwes, 1901)
 Kretania patriarcha (Bálint, 1992)
 Kretania philbyi (Graves, 1925)
 Kretania pylaon (Fischer de Waldheim, 1832) – zephyr blue
 Kretania sephirus (Frivaldszky, 1835)
 Kretania stekolnikovi Stradomsky & Tikhonov, 2015
 Kretania trappi (Verity, 1927)
 Kretania usbekus (Forster, 1939)
 Kretania zephyrinus (Christoph, 1884)

The alcedo species-group:
 Kretania alcedo (Christoph, 1877)

Taxonomy
Kretania used to be often included in Polyommatus or in Plebejus, but molecular studies have led to reinstate it as a valid genus, now also encompassing species formerly included in Plebejides (i.e. the pylaon species-group), and K. alcedo (formerly in Vacciniina).

References

External links

 
Lycaenidae genera